Al-Numaniya Sport Club, is an Iraqi football team based in Al-Nu'maniya District, Wasit, that plays in the Iraq Division Two.

History

in Premier League
Al-Numaniya played in the Iraqi Premier League for the first time in the 1988–89 season in the South Group, and were relegated to the Iraq Division One.

Managerial history
 Abdul Hassan Hussein
 Ihsan Alaa

See also 
 2020–21 Iraq FA Cup

References

External links
 Al-Numaniya SC on Goalzz.com
 Iraq Clubs- Foundation Dates

Football clubs in Wasit